Net 10 can mean:
NET10 Wireless, a prepaid mobile phone brand of TracFone Wireless, the U.S. MVNO subsidiary of América Móvil
A trade credit notation (in Net D form) on an invoice stating full payment is due in 10 days
NET 10, an Indonesian news program broadcast on NET